Aerocancun was an airline based in Mexico, that operated from 1989 to 1996.

Company details

Aerocancun was based in Cancún, Quintana Roo, and operated charter flights to cities in the U.S. and Canada, including Miami, New Orleans, New York City, Oakland, Boston, Pittsburgh, Calgary and Edmonton.  Aerocancun also operated flights to Europe, but these were canceled in 1994 due to financial problems caused by an economic recession.  During 1994 and 1995, the airline concentrated on the South American market.  Aerocancun was owned by Mexican hoteliers and the Spanish airline Oasis. When the Oasis group collapsed at the end of 1996, Aerocancun filed for bankruptcy.

Fleet
Aerocancun consisted of the following fleet:

1 Airbus A300-600R
2 Airbus A310-300
1 McDonnell Douglas DC-10-15
5 McDonnell Douglas MD-83

See also
List of defunct airlines of Mexico

References

External links

Defunct airlines of Mexico
Charter airlines of Mexico
Airlines established in 1989
Airlines disestablished in 1996
Cancún